Snihurivka Raion was a subdivision of Mykolaiv Oblast of Ukraine. Its administrative center was the town of Snihurivka. The raion was abolished on 18 July 2020 as part of the administrative reform of Ukraine, which reduced the number of raions of Mykolaiv Oblast to four. The area of Snihurivka Raion was merged into Bashtanka Raion. The last estimate of the raion population was 

At the time of disestablishment, the raion consisted of three hromadas, 
 Horokhivske rural hromada with the administration in the selo of Horokhivske;
 Shyroke rural hromada with the administration in the selo of Shyroke;
 Snihurivka urban hromada with the administration in Snihurivka.

Russian re-establishment and annexation 
During the 2022 Russian invasion of Ukraine, Snihurivka was occupied by Russian forces starting  from the 19th of March 2022.

In august 2022, Russia decided to re-establish Snihurivka Raion and to transfer it to Kherson Oblast, with Yuriy Barbashov being appointed as the head of the military-civilian administration of Snihurivka Raion. In this capacity, Snihurivka Raion was included in the illegal annexation referendum of Kherson Oblast in september 2022, with the local Russian-appointed authorities participating in the process. A group of locals however protested against the referendum.

On 5 October 2022, Yuriy Barbashov stated on Telegram that "Snihurivka remains under the control of Russian troops", while Mykolaiv Oblast Governor Vitalii Kim noted that officials were "seeking to confirm that Russian officers have left but there are troops still remaining there". 

On the 9th of November, the Russian Defense Minister Sergei Shoigu announced the withdrawal of Russian forces from the right bank of the Dnipro River. As a consequence, Snihurivka Raion was liberated by Ukrainian troops the next day. Russia hower still claims the whole territory of what they consider to be Kherson Oblast.

References

Former raions of Mykolaiv Oblast
1923 establishments in Ukraine
Ukrainian raions abolished during the 2020 administrative reform